Senate Bill 266, or SB 266, may refer to one of these pieces of legislation
 Comprehensive Counter-Terrorism Act, a bill supported by Joe Biden which would restrict internet encryption
 Florida House Bill 999, pending Florida legislation which has a state senate counterpart designated SB 266